Hangzhou No.14 High School is a provincial level key high school located at 580 Fengqi Road, Hangzhou, Zhejiang. The school is located at the center of the city. In front of Mituo Mountain and near West Lake, the school is energized by the atmosphere of Baochu Mountain and Baopu Monastery, as well as the luxurious shopping of Yan'an Road and Wulinmen. The building area is about thirty thousand square meters. Although its history goes back more than 100 years, it is not the oldest school in Hangzhou. Its objective is to make the campus modern and luxurious. Hangzhou Senior Middle School and Hangzhou No. 2 High School were founded in 1899, making them older than Hangzhou No. 14. Hangzhou Xuejun High School was set up in 1956 and Hangzhou Zhongce Vocational School in 1979.

In the 30th year of Emperor Guangxu’s reign, a group of students including Shao Zhang (绍张), Sun Zhimin and Hu Huan came back to Hangzhou after graduating in Japan, and applied to establish “Hangzhou Girls’ School”, and wished this school to become the first girls’ school in China.

The application was approved, and the school opened on May 2, 1904. Lady Gu Wenyu was the first principal, and there were 45 girls at that time.

Some years later, the school moved the place from Jishan Square to its current location on Fengqi Road. The street was originally called “Copper Money” in Chinese, but has since changed to “Phoenix Rising.”

No.14 Secondary School went through the Second Sino-Japanese War, adding to the interesting history of the school. In November 1937, the Japanese landed in Hangzhou Bay, and the students were forced to move from its Fengqi Road location to the rural city of Tonglu. A month later, they moved again, this time to Chunan, and used some parts of the Chunan County Middle School. Unfortunately, sinking into Thousand Island Lake in 1959, the old Chunan County Middle School was buried along with the capital city of the Southern Song Dynasty forever. Although the Japanese came, then left, then came again, then left again, the cultural spirit of the Girls’ School remained. In 1937, teacher Zhen Jisu and another five teachers moved to Shanghai, where they established the Shanghai Municipal Hangzhou Girls' School on Changde Road, Shanghai. The next year, on Jiaozhou Road, the school formally became Shanghai Private Nanping Girls' School. Shanghai is not a quiet place, however, so in the spring of 1941, the school returned to Hangzhou, this time to Xinmin Road, and began the term on November 1 using the Tongjiangqiao Middle School’s campus. In the spring of 1949, the school moved back to Fengqi Road, this time permanently, and in 1956, changed its name to Hangzhou Girls' High School.
The first headmaster of this school was Gu Wenyu, but now a new leader, Qiu Feng holds this title.
Another campus of No.14 Secondary School is located at 500,Long Teng Road, Hangzhou. It has a 400-meter runway, a rich collection of books, and excellent teaching facilities.
Hang Zhou No.14 high school is the first high school that opened a climbing course to students in Hangzhou.

Honors
No.14 second's students are top students of Hangzhou. In 2003, Meng Linyan (孟琳燕) won the gold medal of the International Biology Olympic Olympic competition which was held in Belarus 
In 2004 student Lou Tianchen (楼天城) won the gold medal of the 16th middle school students of international information Athens Olympic competition
Along with its accomplishments this school has held diverse activities, including solemn Zhejiang Students Art Festival in October 2013, which this school has won the first prize on chorus with "Snowflake" and Chamber Orchestra with "Folk Dance of Romania".
In 2013, the grade of Zhongkao of No.14 high school is 500, it is the fourth in Hangzhou.

News
2017 - Ethics of Dipont Education practices at Hangzhou No. 14 called into question.

2013 - The top students in Hangzhou No. 14 High School took part in the "Hangzhou outstanding student cadre training in the four city proper."

AP center
AP center was set in 2012, as the first AP center in Hangzhou. There are 124 students enrolled, including 60 students in grade 10, 60 students in grade 11 and 4 students in grade 12. Up to now, More than 10 AP courses are provided. AP center also have various activities such as Yoga, Kiva, play chess, card game, kickball, Spanish, French, debate, etc. to enrich student's daily life and enable them to study beyond course content. During western festivals such as Christmas, Halloween and Thanksgiving Day, AP center hold parties to celebrate, familiarizing students with western culture.
From December 12–16, 2013, Japanese students and teachers visited No.14 AP center.

Curriculum
In in AP Center in Hangzhou No.14 High School/

Students
The class size is currently 30. Each grade has 2 classes, 60 students in total.
The earliest group of 4 students were transferred from non-AP classes in 2012.

 The class of 2012 was experimental and was not open to applicants outside of school.

References

External links
Official website

High schools in Zhejiang
Education in Hangzhou